Minagoemura (Japanese: 皆越村, みなごえむら) was a village in the Kumamoto Prefecture, Japan located in the Kuma District. It was established on 1 April 1897 and incorporated into the village of Kamimura (now part of the Asagiri) on 7 December 1895.

References 

Dissolved municipalities of Kumamoto Prefecture
Populated places in Kumamoto Prefecture